Ağyazı (also, Ağayazı) is a village and municipality in the Qakh Rayon of Azerbaijan. It has a population of 733. The municipality consists of the villages of Ağyazı and Üzümlükənd.

References 

Populated places in Qakh District